The 2000–01 season is the 91st season of competitive football by Ayr United.

Competitions

Pre season

Scottish First Division

Matches

Scottish League Cup

Scottish Challenge Cup

Scottish Cup

Final League table

Results summary

Results by round

References

Ayr United F.C. seasons
Ayr United